The 1999–2000 National Soccer League season, was the 24th season of the National Soccer League in Australia.

Overview
1999–2000 was the first season since a 1995–96 rebrand to be officially known as the National Soccer League after Ericsson withdrew their sponsorship shortly before the season.

The league was originally scheduled for 17 teams, however with the late withdrawal of the Southern Stars, (previously Adelaide Sharks and West Adelaide) Soccer Australia was forced to redraw fixtures less than a week out from the season. The rescheduled 34-week season saw each team play two teams four times, and the remaining teams two times.

Wollongong Wolves won the championship. Auckland Kingz and Parramatta Power entered the competition.

Regular season

League table

Finals series

Grand Final

Footnotes

References
Australia - List of final tables (RSSSF)

National Soccer League (Australia) seasons
2000 in Australian soccer
1999 in Australian soccer
Aus
Aus